Hugh Pearman may refer to:

 Hugh Pearman (cricketer) (born 1945), English cricketer
 Hugh Pearman (architecture critic) (born 1955), British architecture critic and editor